John W. Pilley (July 1, 1928 – June 17, 2018) was an American behavioral psychologist best known for his research into canine cognition and language learning with his Border collie, Chaser, who had the largest tested memory of any non-human animal. He was a professor emeritus in the Department of Psychology at Wofford College and was an avid kayaker throughout his life. Pilley was awarded an honorary Doctor of Psychology from Wofford College in 2016.

Education 
Pilley was a graduate of Abilene Christian University in Abilene, Texas. He studied at Pepperdine University and received his theological degree from Princeton Theological Seminary in Princeton, New Jersey. He received master’s degrees from Stetson University and Memphis State University, where he also received his Ph.D. in psychology.

Career 
Out of the media frenzy surrounding Chaser, Pilley was asked to write a book about his journey with Chaser and the dogs that came before her. In 2013, Pilley teamed with writer Hilary Hinzmann to pen the book, Chaser: Unlocking the Genius of the Dog Who Knows a Thousand Words, which became a New York Times bestseller. Training Chaser was his most notable achievement as Chaser could recognize 1022 words or items.

References 

Pepperdine University alumni
Abilene Christian University alumni
Wofford College faculty
Stetson University alumni
University of Memphis alumni
Princeton Theological Seminary alumni
1928 births
2018 deaths
20th-century American male writers
21st-century American male writers
20th-century American scientists
21st-century American scientists